Peter Cklamovski (born 16 October 1978) is an Australian football manager who currently serves as the manager of J2 League team Montedio Yamagata.

Prior to his appointment as manager of Montedio Yamagata, Cklamovski had served as the manager of Shimizu S-Pulse, as an assistant coach of Panachaiki, of the Australian national team and at Yokohama F. Marinos, and had served as a fitness coach at Perth Glory, Adelaide United and Melbourne Victory.

Managerial statistics

References

1978 births
Living people
Australian people of Macedonian descent
Australian soccer players
Association football midfielders
Rockdale Ilinden FC players
Bonnyrigg White Eagles FC players
Australian soccer coaches
J1 League managers
J2 League managers
Shimizu S-Pulse managers
Montedio Yamagata managers
Australian Macedonian soccer managers
Australian expatriate soccer coaches
Australian expatriate sportspeople in Japan
Expatriate football managers in Japan